Laura Weber White, also known as Laura White, Laura Weber, Laura Cash, and Laura Weber Cash is an American country fiddler, singer, songwriter, and guitar player. White has worked as a session musician on many albums and toured with several artists, including the late Johnny Cash and June Carter Cash. She has released two solo albums:  Among My Souvenirs in 2003 and Awake But Dreaming in 2010. Both were recorded at the Cash Cabin Studio. White became known as a fine stage fiddler after winning both state and National Fiddler contests in Oregon and Idaho. She is an artist on 16 Cash family albums from 2003 to 2014.

In 1999, White joined the Press On tour with June Carter Cash and Johnny Cash, where she met their son, John Carter Cash, whom she wed in 2000. They later divorced in 2013. She played on June Carter Cash's 2003 album, Wildwood Flower, which won a Grammy Award for Best Traditional Folk album. White also contributed fiddle to Johnny Cash's American III and American IV albums.

From 2012 to 2016, White was a member of the Carter Family III music group. The Carter Family III released their first album, Past & Present, in 2010. The Carter Family III was made up of Laura Cash, John Cash and Dale Jett. Dale Jett is the grandson of A.P. Carter and Sara Carter. John Carter is the grandson of Maybelle Carter.

White played for the 45th Annual Academy of Country Music Awards in 2010. She played in the documentary, The Winding Stream: The Carters, the Cashes and the Course of Country Music. Winding Stream is a HD history documentary that runs 90-minutes, telling the story of the musical generations of the Carter and Cash families. Winding Stream honors these multi-generational families importance in the history of country music. She went on to tour with her then future in-laws, June Carter and Johnny Cash. White's ex-husband John Carter Cash, is a record producer, singer, songwriter, and author.  He is the grandson of Maybelle Carter (1909–1978) and the only son of Johnny Cash (1932–2003) and June Carter Cash (1929–2003).

Biography

Laura Weber White was born in Sandwich, Illinois, in 1971.  Her mom and dad were living in Plano, Illinois, at the time. The family moved when she was 6 and she grew up in Corvallis, Oregon. She started to play music at the age of nine. She received from her father a restored fiddle which became her special instrument. To have the fiddle restored, her dad traded carpentry work for the restoration. She started to win fiddling contests in the western United States at age 12. Her teacher was fiddler and rhythm guitarist Joey McKenzie. She won a number of State and Regional titles. By 17 she won the National Junior Fiddle Champion title at Weiser, Idaho. In 1989 she enrolled in Oregon State University, but in 1990, she departed college at age 18 to take a job playing and singing with Patty Loveless in Nashville. She had been in Nashville before for Grand Master's Fiddle Contests. In addition to fiddling, she sings, plays the guitar and mandolin. In 1991 White played bluegrass in Sakaide, Kagawa. Back in Nashville, she toured with Patty Loveless, Pam Tillis, James House, Harley Allen and Chalee Tennison. She played fiddle with Roy Acuff on his show. She played the Grand Ole Opry with Ray Price, and has recorded with many artists including: Johnny Cash, George Jones, Loretta Lynn, Kris Kristofferson, Merle Haggard, Willie Nelson, Sheryl Crow, Billy Joe Shaver, Larry Gatlin, Rodney Crowell, Earl Scruggs, Benny Martin, Larry Gatlin, Emmylou Harris, and Marty Stuart.

White has two children, AnnaBelle and Jack, and lives in Nashville with her husband, Jeff White, a bluegrass guitarist and singer. They were married on March 12, 2017, in Goodlettsville, Tennessee.

Discography 
White's Discography:

Albums
Solo Albums

Group Album

Vocals

Instruments

Performances
Selected: Tours, Performances and Events.

See also

 List of country musicians

External links

 Facebook Laura Weber White

Laura White Photo gallery
Laura White Video gallery
youtube.com Laura solo on The Carter Family III, Bury Me Beneath the Willow
youtube.com, Laura and Larry Gatlin sing Diamonds In The Rough, Ryman Auditorium Nov. 10, 2003
youtube.com, Laura Weber contestant at Grand Master Fiddle Championship held at Opryland Theme Park June 11,1989
vimeo.com, Video Laura Cash on Mother Maybelle, Guitarist

References

1971 births
American women country singers
American country singer-songwriters
Living people
Johnny Cash
Cash–Carter family
Country singers
American women singer-songwriters
American bluegrass fiddlers
20th-century American musicians
American country fiddlers
American fiddlers
Musicians from Nashville, Tennessee
Southern old-time fiddlers
American folk musicians
American mandolinists
21st-century American composers
Singer-songwriters from Oregon
American women guitarists
American bluegrass musicians
21st-century American women
Singer-songwriters from Tennessee